Choose Something Like a Star may refer to:
Choose Something Like a Star, a poem by Robert Frost
Choose Something Like a Star (album), 2005 album by Mormon Tabernacle Choir
"Choose Something Like a Star" (song), 2004 song by Tim Deluxe